is a line of Japanese stuffed monkey toys from the Sekiguchi Corporation, first released in 1974. They were licensed by Mattel in the United States until 1985, and later distributed worldwide directly by Sekiguchi. 
Four television series were produced based on the characters: The Japanese anime series  in 1980, produced by Tokyo 12 Channel (now TV Tokyo), the American cartoon series Monchhichis in 1983, produced by Hanna-Barbera Productions, the French cartoon series Kiki, le Kiki de tous les Kiki in 2001, produced by Ben-J Productions, the Japanese stop-motion series  in 2005, by Kids Station and the French CGI series Monchhichi Tribe (La Tribu Monchhichi) in 2017, produced by Technicolor Animation Productions.

History
The Monchhichi franchise is held by the Sekiguchi Corporation, a famous doll company, located in Tokyo, Japan. Monchhichi was created by Yoshiharu Washino  on January 25, 1974, as an improvement to the already successful Kuta Kuta Monkey  (Exhausted monkey).
Sekiguchi claims they created these characters in order to inspire respect and love in the young (Japanese) children and adults, their name is derived from the words "Mon" which translates to "Mine" in French and "Chichi" which closely resembles the sound a child's pacifier would produce according to Japanese phonetics, also the resulting word has a similar sound to the word "Monkey" in English.

The dolls were successful in Japan, and the animated TV series, Futago no Monchhichi (ふたごのモンチッチ, Monchhichi Twins) which ran in 1980, helped increase its popularity even further.

Export of the doll line started in 1975, to Germany and Austria. The following years would see the Monchhichi line marketed in more countries. The original name was changed to "Chicaboo" in the United Kingdom, to "Mon Cicci" in Italy, to "Kiki" in France, to "Bølle" in Denmark, to "Moncsicsi" in Hungary and to "Virkiki" in Spain. The height of the Monchhichi dolls' popularity was in Germany during the 1980s, surpassing even the Japanese figure sales during this period.

The Monchhichi doll line reached North American shores in 1980. Mattel bought the license for the toy line.  The American cartoon series Monchhichis was produced by Hanna-Barbera in 1983 and aired on ABC (as part of The Monchhichis/Little Rascals/Richie Rich Show) in an effort to promote the doll line. The line was dropped by Mattel due to poor sales in 1985, but was reintroduced during Monchhichi's 30 anniversary in 2004 by Sekiguchi. As of 2013, Monchhichi dolls are still available in the United States from retailers such as Target.

As of 2015, Monchchichi are still popular in Germany, sometimes filling an entire rack space in toy shops. Many variants and sizes of Monchhichi have emerged. For example, the original Monchhichi is still available under the Classic variant in 10 cm, 20 cm, 24 cm, 45 cm and even 80 cm sizes. Also other variants like Boutique (Monchhichi in various dress styles), Mother Care (Monchhichi with a young one in her front pocket), and the 40th Anniversary edition are available. Even dollhouses for Monchhichi are available.

1980 anime series

 is a Japanese animated series which first aired in 1980.

Japanese voice cast
 Monchhichi–kun – Fuyumi Shiraishi
 Lily–chan – Keiko Han
 Sakura–san – Fei Fei Liu
 Amy – Sanji Hase

1983 American animated television series

The American Monchhichi cartoon aired on ABC in the 1983–1984 season.

See also

References

External links
 Official Monchhichi website 
 

1970s toys
1980 anime television series debuts
1980s toys
Doll brands
Japanese brands
Fictional monkeys
Mattel
Toy companies of Japan
Toy animals
TV Tokyo original programming
Japanese popular culture